Vieta is a lunar impact crater that lies due north of the walled plain Schickard, in the southwestern part of the Moon. About half a crater diameter to the southeast is the smaller Fourier, and to the north-northeast lies Cavendish.

The outer rim of this crater has undergone some impact erosion, and small craters lie along the northeast, south, and north-northwestern sides. The inner walls are irregular, with incised bases in some locations. A chain of small craters lies across the northern half of the interior floor, following a line towards the east-northeast. The floor is nearly level, but with some uneven areas in the south and by the crater chain.

Satellite craters
By convention these features are identified on lunar maps by placing the letter on the side of the crater midpoint that is closest to Vieta.

References

 
 
 
 
 
 
 
 
 
 
 
 

Impact craters on the Moon